Malham may refer to:
 Malham, Ardabil
 Malham, Maku, West Azerbaijan Province
 Malham, Salmas, West Azerbaijan Province